Born to Dance is a 2015 New Zealand feature film. It was written by Steve Barr, Hone Kouka and Casey Whelan and is the feature film direction debut by Tammy Davis, best known for his role as Munter in Outrageous Fortune.
The film was released on 24 September 2015 in New Zealand. Born to Dance is choreographed by Parris Goebel, who has worked with Jennifer Lopez and Cirque du Soleil, as well as recently acting and co-choreographing in the fifth installment of the Step Up franchise.

Plot
A coming of age tale told through the eyes of 'Tu', a young Maori man from South Auckland who dreams of being a professional hip-hop dancer. His father, a military man, dislikes his lack of direction and threatens him with Army enlistment in six weeks. Tu conceals his dancing from his father. He dances with a local crew 2PK, but also hides from them his personal ambition to win the national championships.

Tu’s dancing appears in a YouTube video of smooth moves that goes viral, and is noticed by the country’s reigning hip-hop stars, K-Crew.  Kane (Jordan Vaha’akolo) the ruthless troupe leader, invites Tu to audition. Tu trains with K-Crew along with other hopefuls over several nights, and ultimately none of them are selected - instead, Kane steals Tu's best moves. It is revealed that the auditions are a sham, designed to bring K-Crew new dance material, which they rip off and use every year. Tu befriend's Kane’s girlfriend, American dancer Sasha (Kherington Payne), but Kane's jealousy halts their relationship. Her affluent North Shore lifestyle clashes with his own.

Tu admits to his father his love of dance, and received his blessing. He returns to 2PK and trains relentlessly for the national championships along with the K-Crew rejects. The film's finale is the dance-off for places in the finals, and Tu cleverly forms a new crew called Freaks, literally during the competition itself, by pretending that 2PK members are from different crews - they battle and suddenly synchronise. Freaks battle K-Crew in the final and win the competition. Tu and Sasha kiss.

Cast 
 Tia Maipi as Tu
 Kherington Payne as Sasha
 John Tui as Zack
 Kelvin Taylor as African American Dance Crew Leader
 Parris Goebel
 Stan Walker as Benjy
 Alexandra Carson as Sophie
 Jordan Vaha'akolo as Kane
 Onyeka Arapai
 Kaea Pearce
 Kirsten Dodgen

Production 
In October 2014, it was announced that production on the film commenced in Auckland. It was also announced that film newcomer Tia Maipi would play the lead role of ‘Tu’ alongside Kherington Payne (who had starred in So You Think You Can Dance and Katy Perry’s California Dreams Tour) and Australian Idol winner Stan Walker. Eight-time world hip hop champion Parris Goebel served as choreographer on the film.

Release 
The official trailer was released on 21 July 2015. The poster was released on 28 July 2015. The film was released in New Zealand on 24 September 2015.

The film was released in Australia on 5 November 2015.

Soundtrack
The official soundtrack for the film was released on 18 September 2015 through Sony Music Records. New Zealand DJ and Producer, P-Money curated the tracks synonymous with kiwi culture. Included on the album are songs from David Dallas, Sid Diamond, Scribe and lead single “Start Again” by Stan Walker and Samantha Jade. On 2 October, the soundtrack reached number 38 on the New Zealand Albums Chart.

Reception
The film opened to mixed reviews.

Graeme Tuckett of Stuff.co.nz rated Born to Dance four out of five stars and praise the dancing ability of the actors, especially considering the lack of "wires, stunt doubles or even much camera trickery". The New Zealand Herald Francesca Rudkin and 3 News''' Kate Rodger praised P-Money's work on the soundtrack.

The film's "cringe-worthy" dialogue was criticised by Alice Harbourne from Metro''.

References

External links 
 
 
 

2015 films
Films shot in New Zealand
New Zealand drama films
Films set in Auckland
Films about dance competitions
2010s dance films
2010s hip hop films
2015 drama films
2010s English-language films